The 2019–20 North Florida Ospreys men's basketball team represents the University of North Florida in the 2019–20 NCAA Division I men's basketball season. The Ospreys, led by 11th-year head coach Matthew Driscoll, play their home games at the UNF Arena in Jacksonville, Florida as members of the Atlantic Sun Conference.

Previous season
The Ospreys finished the 2018–19 season 16–17 overall, 9–7 in ASUN play to finish in a tie for third place. In the ASUN tournament, they defeated North Alabama in the quarterfinals, before losing to Liberty in the semifinals.

Roster

Schedule and results

|-
!colspan=12 style=| Non-conference regular season

|-
!colspan=9 style=| Atlantic Sun Conference regular season

|-
!colspan=12 style=| Atlantic Sun tournament
|-

|-

Source

References

North Florida Ospreys men's basketball seasons
North Florida Ospreys
North Florida Ospreys men's basketball
North Florida Ospreys men's basketball